Lynn Heritage State Park was a history-themed state park in downtown Lynn, Massachusetts, and was part of the Metropolitan Park System of Greater Boston. It opened in 1986. The Lynn Museum and Historical Society (the tenant of the former Park Visitor Center building) now displays exhibits which highlight the city's industrial past, the tradition of shoemaking and its transition from a handicraft to mechanization, and the story of Elihu Thomson, an engineer and inventor instrumental in the founding of General Electric. The park offers guided tours and a self-guided walking tour and includes the nearby  Waterfront Park, located at Lynn Harbor.

References

External links
Lynn Heritage State Park Department of Conservation and Recreation

Lynn, Massachusetts
State parks of Massachusetts
Parks in Essex County, Massachusetts
Museums in Essex County, Massachusetts
Industry museums in Massachusetts
Protected areas established in 1986
1986 establishments in Massachusetts